The National Eisteddfod of Wales is the largest of several eisteddfodau that are held annually, mostly in Wales. Its eight days of competitions and performances are considered the largest music and poetry festival in Europe. Competitors typically number 6,000 or more, and overall attendance generally exceeds 150,000 visitors. The 2018 Eisteddfod was held in Cardiff Bay with a fence-free 'Maes'. In 2020, the event was held virtually under the name AmGen; events were held over a one-week period.

History
 The National Museum of Wales says that "the history of the Eisteddfod may [be] traced back to a bardic competition held by the Lord Rhys in Cardigan Castle in 1176", and local Eisteddfodau have certainly been held for many years prior to the first national Eisteddfod.
One of the most dramatic events in Eisteddfod history was the award of the 1917 chair to the poet Ellis Humphrey Evans, bardic name Hedd Wyn, for the poem Yr Arwr (The Hero). The winner was announced, and the crowd waited for the winner to stand up to accept the traditional congratulations before the chairing ceremony, but no winner appeared. It was then announced that Hedd Wyn had been killed the previous month on the battlefield at Passchendaele in Belgium. These events were portrayed in the Academy Award nominated film Hedd Wyn.

In 1940, during the Second World War, the Eisteddfod was not held, for fear that it would be a bombing target. Instead, the BBC broadcast an Eisteddfod radio programme, and the Chair, Crown and a Literature Medal (as opposed to the usual Prose Medal) were awarded.

From 1950 onward, a newly created rule required all competitions to be held in Welsh. However, settings of the mass in Latin are allowed and this has been controversially used to allow concerts featuring international soloists.

In recent years efforts have been made to attract more non-Welsh speakers to the event, with the official website stating "everyone is welcome at the Eisteddfod, whatever language they speak". The Eisteddfod offers bilingual signage and simultaneous-translation of many events though wireless headphones. There is also a Welsh-learners area called Maes D. These efforts have helped increase takings, and the 2006 Eisteddfod reported a profit of over £100,000, despite costing £2.8m to stage. The Eisteddfod attracts some 160,000 people annually. The National Eisteddfod in Cardiff (2008) drew record crowds, with over 160,000 visitors attending.

It was proposed that the 2018 National Eisteddfod in Cardiff would use permanent buildings to host events rather than in the traditional Maes site and tents. This was due partially to a lack of suitable land that could be repaired affordably after the festival. It was billed as an "Eisteddfod with no fence" in the media and was held at Cardiff Bay. The 2019 Eisteddfod in Llanrwst returned to the traditional Maes.

The 2020 Eisteddfod was postponed for 12 months because of the international COVID-19 pandemic. This was the first year an Eisteddfod hadn't taken place since 1914, when the event was cancelled at short notice because of the outbreak of the Great War.

Attendance
(incomplete)

Overview 

The National Eisteddfod is traditionally held in the first week of August, and the competitions are all held in the Welsh language. However, settings of the mass in Latin are allowed and this has been controversially used to allow concerts featuring international soloists.

The venue is officially proclaimed a year in advance, at which time the themes and texts for the competitions are published. The organisation for the location will have begun a year or more earlier, and locations are generally known two or three years ahead. The Eisteddfod Act of 1959 allowed local authorities to give financial support to the event. Traditionally, the Eisteddfod venue alternates between north and south Wales; the decision to hold both the 2014 and 2015 Eisteddfodau in South Wales was thus seen as controversial, but the decision was later reversed and Montgomeryshire named as host county for 2015. Occasionally the Eisteddfod has been held in England, although the last occasion was in 1929.

Hundreds of tents, pavilions and booths are erected in an open space to create the Maes (field). The space required for this means that it is rare for the Eisteddfod to be in a city or town: instead it is held somewhere with more space. Car parking for day visitors alone requires several large fields, and many people camp on the site for the whole week.

The festival has a quasi-druidic flavour, with the main literary prizes for poetry and prose being awarded in colourful and dramatic ceremonies under the auspices of the Gorsedd of Bards of the Island of Britain, complete with prominent figures in Welsh cultural life dressed in flowing druidic costumes, flower dances, trumpet fanfares and a symbolic Horn of Plenty. However, the Gorsedd is not an ancient institution or a pagan ceremony but rather a romantic creation by Iolo Morganwg in the 1790s, which first became a formal part of the Eisteddfod ceremonial in 1819. Nevertheless, it is taken very seriously, and an award of a crown or a chair for poetry is a great honour. The Chairing and Crowning ceremonies are the highlights of the week, and are presided over by the Archdruid.

If no stone circle is there already, one is created out of Gorsedd stones, usually taken from the local area. These stone circles are icons all across Wales and signify the Eisteddfod having visited a community. As a cost-saving measure, the 2005 Eisteddfod was the first to use a temporary "fibre-glass stone" circle for the druidic ceremonies instead of a permanent stone circle. This also has the benefit of bringing the Gorsedd ceremonies onto the maes: previously they were often held many miles away, hidden from most of the public.

As well as the main pavilion with the main stage, there are other venues through the week. Some are fixtures every year, hosting gigs (Maes B/Llwyfan y Maes/Caffi Maes B). Other fixtures of the maes are the Pabell Lên (literature pavilion), the Neuadd Ddawns (dance hall), the Pabell Wyddoniaeth a Thechnoleg (science and technology pavilion), Maes D (learners' pavilion), at least one theatre, Y Cwt Drama (the drama hut), Tŷ Gwerin (folk house), Y Lle Celf ("the Art Place") and hundreds of stondinau (stands and booths) where groups, societies, councils, charities and shops exhibit and sell. Since 2004, alcohol has been sold on the maes; previously there was a no-alcohol policy.

Poetry awards
The Eisteddfod's most well-known awards are those for poetry.

Chairing of the Bard

Crowning of the Bard

Welsh-language album of the year

In 2014, the Eisteddfod began to award a Welsh-language Album of the Year (Albwm Cymraeg Y Flwyddyn) during its Maes B event.

National Eisteddfod venues 
(Venues in England are in italics)

The Eisteddfod has visited all the traditional counties of Wales. It has visited five of the six cities in Wales: Bangor, Cardiff, Newport, St David's and Swansea; it has never visited St Asaph, which has only been a city since 2012.

See also

 Gold Medal (National Eisteddfod of Wales)
 Royal National Mòd
 Welsh Learner of the Year

References

External links 

  
  

Welsh music awards
Arts festivals in Wales
Eisteddfod
Music festivals in Wales
Welsh-language music
Music festivals established in 1861
Annual events in Wales
August events
Celtic music festivals
1861 establishments in Wales
Summer events in Wales
Music festivals in the United Kingdom